Benito Antonio Martínez Ocasio (born March 10, 1994), known professionally as Bad Bunny, is a Puerto Rican rapper and singer. His musical style is primarily defined as Latin trap and reggaeton, although his music also incorporates various other elements from other genres. He rose to prominence in 2016 with his song "Diles", which led to a deal with Hear This Music. He continued gaining traction with songs such as "Soy Peor" and collaborations with Farruko, Karol G, Ozuna, J Balvin, and more during the next few years.

His breakthrough came in 2018 with his feature on Cardi B's number-one song "I Like It" alongside J Balvin, and his top-ten song "Mia" featuring Drake. His debut album X 100pre was released in December 2018 by Rimas Entertainment, which peaked at number 11 on the US Billboard 200. He then released his collaborative album Oasis with J Balvin in June 2019, reaching number nine on the Billboard 200. Bad Bunny's second album YHLQMDLG was released on February 29, 2020, and became the highest charting all-Spanish album, reaching number two on the Billboard 200. It was followed up with the compilation album Las que no iban a salir in May, which reached number seven on the chart.

In November 2020, Bad Bunny released his fourth album El Último Tour Del Mundo, combining his reggaeton and Latin trap sound with rock music. The album became the first all-Spanish-language album to reach number one on the Billboard 200 and its lead single "Dákiti" debuted in the top ten on the US Billboard Hot 100. In May 2022, his fifth album Un Verano Sin Ti was released and spent 13 weeks atop the Billboard 200, while four of the album's singles peaked in the top ten on the Billboard Hot 100. Un Verano Sin Ti became the number-one album of the year in the US as well as the world's best-selling album of 2022. It was also the first Spanish-language album to earn a Grammy nomination for Album of the Year.

Bad Bunny is credited with helping Spanish-language music achieve mainstream popularity in the worldwide market. In 2020, he became the first non-English language act to be Spotify's most streamed artist of the year and achieved the same record again in 2021. He then had the biggest streaming year for any artist on Spotify in 2022. Bad Bunny has earned three Grammy Awards, four Latin Grammy Awards, eight Billboard Music Awards, and thirteen Lo Nuestro Awards. He was crowned Artist of the Year at the Apple Music Awards 2022.

Early life 
Benito Antonio Martínez Ocasio was born on March 10, 1994, and raised in the Almirante Sur barrio of Vega Baja, Puerto Rico. His father, Tito Martínez, was a truck driver, and his mother, Lysaurie Ocasio, is a retired schoolteacher. His parents had often listened to genres such as salsa, merengue, and pop ballads. He has two younger brothers, Bernie and Bysael. He has said, "I wasn't the kid who got involved in the streets. I liked to be at home with my family."

As a child, he attended church weekly with his devoutly Catholic mother and sang in the church choir until age 13. After leaving the choir, he developed an interest in the artists he heard on the radio, particularly Daddy Yankee and Héctor Lavoe. His stage name originally came from a time in which he was forced to wear a bunny costume and was angry about it.

Speaking about the Puerto Rican music industry, he stated, "I'm from Vega Baja, a small area that's not a metropolis like San Juan where the majority of the genre's artists have come from."

Career

2013–2017: Early career beginnings 
He started to write and create his own interpretations at the age of 14, until, in 2013, he began to publish his songs through SoundCloud, including "Get" in 2013, "Tentación" in 2014, "Just let me know" in 2015, among others. In 2016, his song "Diles" caught the attention of DJ Luian from SoundCloud who signed him to his record label, Hear this Music. His single "Soy Peor" reached number 19 on the Hot Latin Songs chart. Bad Bunny's May 2017 collaboration with Karol G, "Ahora Me Llama", reached number 10 on the Billboard Hot Latin Songs chart. It was listed on "Alt.Latino's Favorites: The Songs Of 2017" as one of the best Latin songs of 2017.

In the summer of 2017, Bad Bunny signed a booking deal with Cardenas Marketing Network (CMN) for several Latin American countries. Starting in November 2017, Bad Bunny hosted Beats 1's first Spanish-language show, Trap Kingz. The remix of "Te Boté" with Ozuna and Nicky Jam reached number one on the Hot Latin Songs chart.

2018–2019: X 100pre, and Oasis 

In May 2018, American rapper Cardi B released a collaboration with Bad Bunny and J Balvin, "I Like It". On October 11, 2018, Bad Bunny released "Mia" with Drake, which reached number five on the Billboard Hot 100.

Bad Bunny released his debut album X 100pre on December 24, 2018, on Christmas Eve 2018 on Rimas Entertainment. At Metacritic, X 100pre received an average score of 84 based on five reviews. Alexis Petridis of The Guardian praised Bad Bunny's "off-kilter creativity".

In 2020, X 100pre was voted 447th in Rolling Stones 500 Greatest Albums of All Time.

On June 28, 2019, Bad Bunny released Oasis, an eight-song collaborative album with J Balvin. It peaked at number nine on the Billboard Hot 100 and topped the Billboard US Latin Albums chart. In July 2019, he joined protests against governor Ricardo Rosselló. Bad Bunny and Residente released "" ("Sharpening the knives") during the demonstrations.

 2020–2021: YHLQMDLG, Las que no iban a salir, and El Último Tour del Mundo 

In February 2020, Bad Bunny was a guest performer at the Super Bowl LIV halftime show, headlined by Shakira and Jennifer Lopez. Bad Bunny announced the album YHLQMDLG on February 27, 2020, during an appearance on The Tonight Show Starring Jimmy Fallon and stated that it would be released on Leap Day 2020. It was released on February 29, 2020. The album's title stands for "Yo Hago Lo Que Me Da La Gana" (Spanish for "I Do What I Want") and features collaborations with Daddy Yankee, Yaviah, Jowell & Randy, Ñengo Flow, among other artist. The album is an homage to the marquesinas (garage parties) Bad Bunny grew up attending, and features many nods to early/mid-2000s reggaeton. On the final song on the album, "<3", the artist announced his intention to retire after releasing one more album with the lyric "In nine months I'll release another, to retire calmly like Miguel Cotto", referencing the retirement of the Puerto Rican boxer. He noted that the stress of fame has had a negative impact on his mental health.

YHLQMDLG debuted at number two on the US Billboard 200, becoming the highest-charting all-Spanish album ever on the chart at the time. The album was met with critical acclaim, who praised the album's musical diversity. "Vete" was released as the lead single of the album on November 22, 2019. The album title was first mentioned during a sequence of the accompanying music video. The second single, "Ignorantes", with Panamanian singer Sech came out on February 14, 2020. In March 2020, Bad Bunny released the music video for "Yo Perreo Sola", in which the artist performs in drag. The final frame of the video denounces sexual harassment of women, and reads: ""If she doesn't want to dance with you, respect her, she twerks alone". On the song and video, Bad Bunny stated "I wrote it from the perspective of a woman. I wanted a woman's voice to sing it–'yo perreo sola'–because it doesn't mean the same thing when a man sings it. But I do feel like that woman sometimes". "Yo Perreo Sola" landed number one on the Billboard Latin Airplay chart, earning Bad Bunny his ninth No.1 on the chart in just over two years.

On April 4, 2020, he released the song "En Casita" on SoundCloud, which expressed solidarity towards others in quarantine due to COVID-19 and featured vocals from his girlfriend, Gabriela Berlingeri. On May 10, 2020, Bad Bunny released his third solo studio album (fourth overall) Las que no iban a salir, without previous announcements. The album's title translates to "The Ones that Were Not Going to Come Out" and is primarily a compilation of previously unreleased or unfinished songs. Songs from the album were played on an Instagram live stream that Bad Bunny made in late April. The album features collaborations with Don Omar, Yandel, Zion & Lennox, Nicky Jam, and Jhay Cortez. Discussing the album's surprise release, Bad Bunny explained, "There was no real meaning behind it. I just thought, 'Damn. What people need is entertainment'. Bad Bunny had been filming his supporting role in Narcos: Mexico before filming was postponed due to the pandemic. It premiered in November 2021.

In July 2020, he appeared on the first digital cover of Playboy magazine as the first man to appear on the cover other than the magazine's founder, Hugh Hefner. The cover was shot by photographer Stillz in Miami, Florida, and the magazine includes a feature article entitled "Bad Bunny is Not Playing God." He also received the ASCAP Latin award for Songwriter of the Year. The following month, his song "Pero Ya No" appeared in an advertisement for politician Joe Biden's 2020 United States presidential election campaign. On September 20, 2020, Bad Bunny performed a surprise, live (via his YouTube channel and Uforia), free concert from atop a flatbed truck that looked like a subway car going through the streets of New York and ended at Harlem Hospital. With a motorcade including police and vehicles flashing their lights, the subway car with Bad Bunny on the top drove through The Bronx and Washington Heights in Manhattan. In October 2020, Bad Bunny released the single "Dakiti", with Jhay Cortez, which topped the Billboard Global 200 and reached number five on the US Hot 100. The song is included on his third studio album, El Último Tour Del Mundo, which was released on November 27, 2020, and was described as a personal and ambitious record. It became the first all-Spanish language album to reach number one on the Billboard 200.

Bad Bunny and YHLQMDLG respectively became Spotify's most-streamed artist and album globally in 2020. It marked the first time a non-English language music artist topped the year-end list, with a The Guardian article considering him "the world's biggest pop star" for his streaming numbers. The album received the Grammy Award for Best Latin Pop or Urban Album at the 63rd Annual Grammy Awards. On February 20, 2021, Bad Bunny performed "La Noche de Anoche" with Rosalía and "Te Deseo Lo Mejor" on Saturday Night Live, hosted by Regé-Jean Page, as well as appearing in the pre-recorded musical sketches "Loco" and "Sea Shanty". On the US Billboard Hot 100, Bad Bunny's next single "Yonaguni" became his fourth top 10 entry and first with no accompanying acts. Bad Bunny was cast in an upcoming David Leitch-directed film starring Brad Pitt.

In July 2021, it was announced that Bad Bunny co-wrote and co-produced the fifth album of Puerto Rican Latin pop artist Tommy Torres titled El Playlist de Anoche. Bad Bunny won the most awards at the 2021 Billboard Latin Music Awards with ten, including the category Artist of the Year. In the following months, he was featured on Aventura's single "Volví", and released "Lo Siento BB:/" with Tainy and Julieta Venegas. In September 2021, he appeared on the Time 100, Times annual list of the 100 most influential people in the world. Bad Bunny's 2022 concert tour, El Último Tour del Mundo, is scheduled to visit the US and Canada. He won Best Urban Music Album and Best Rap/Hip Hop Song at the 22nd Annual Latin Grammy Awards. El Último Tour Del Mundo won Best Música Urbana Album at the 64th Annual Grammy Awards. In December 2021, it was announced that Bad Bunny became Spotify's most-streamed artist of the year globally, for a second year in a row.

 2022–present: Un Verano Sin Ti 
In January 2022, Bad Bunny was featured in Vogue Magazine for the second time modeling the current season's best bags. In April 2022, Sony Pictures announced Bad Bunny as the lead for El Muerto, a film set in Sony's Spider-Man Universe. El Muerto is set to be released on January 12, 2024. On May 6, 2022, Bad Bunny released his fourth (fifth overall) studio album Un Verano Sin Ti which it became commercially successful as it debuted at number one on the Billboard 200 and stood there for thirteen non-consecutive weeks.

Bad Bunny began his fourth concert tour World's Hottest Tour on August 5, 2022, set to visit fourteen countries of the American continent. On October 4, 2022, the tour became the highest-grossing tour by a Latin artist in history, earning US$232.5 million at the time. Bad Bunny received the most nominations (eight) for the 2022 American Music Awards, including his first for artist of the year.

 Artistry 

 Musical style and influences 

Bad Bunny is considered to be primarily a Latin trap and reggaeton artist. As described in a Rolling Stone article, Bad Bunny sings and raps with a "conversational tone", employing "a low, slurry tone, viscous melodies, and a rapper's cadence." Throughout the years, Bad Bunny has listed his influences with a wide variety of artists from multiple genres such as Héctor Lavoe, Vico C, Romeo Santos, Juan Luis Guerra, Elvis Crespo, Ricky Martin, Juan Gabriel, Don Omar, Daddy Yankee, Ivy Queen, Tego Calderón, Wisin & Yandel, Calle 13, Víctor Manuelle, and Marc Anthony, amongst many others. He considers himself to be a "music fanatic" which is the reason why he's inspired by so many people. During an episode of Behind the Music, he talked about Ricky Martin's legacy for Latin music and Latin artists, and how Martin changed the music landscape for future Latin artists. In the music video for Neverita, Bad Bunny paid homage to the Suavemente music video by Puerto Rican artist Elvis Crespo, leaving a message in the end translated from Spanish as "In honor of the best video of all time". Elvis Crespo later felt honored by his tribute and ended up doing a merengue version of the song himself in which he performed at the 2022 Latin Billboard Music Awards.

Although primarily considered to be a Latin trap and reggaeton artist, his music also incorporates various other elements from other genres such as pop, hip-hop, rock, electronic, reggae, dancehall, latin, soul, and R&B. Some publications have credited him for bringing Latin trap into the mainstream in the English-language music market.

According to Timothy Monger of AllMusic, his lyrics "range from humor and pathos to heartbreak and anger (sometimes in the same song)." According to Paper, other themes explored in Bad Bunny's music include "self-love, inclusivity, and LGBTQ acceptance".

 Public image 

Vanessa Rosales of CNN has opined that "in pink, florals and short shorts, Bad Bunny champions a new masculinity".

He has appeared at award shows with manicured, polished, and long fingernails. Ben Beaumont-Thomas of The Guardian opined in 2020 that Bunny's style influenced fellow Latin artists, who "often now share his highly colorful mashup of streetwear and tailoring."

 Personal life 
The rapper met jewelry designer Gabriela Berlingeri in 2017 at a restaurant while dining with his family, and the two began dating soon after. Berlingeri became the first Latina to shoot the cover of Rolling Stone when she photographed the rapper for the magazine's May 2020 cover. In a 2020 interview with the Los Angeles Times, Bad Bunny stated he sees sexuality as fluid. He said, "At the end of the day, I don’t know if in 20 years I will like a man. One never knows in life. But at the moment I am heterosexual and I like women."

 Activism 
Bad Bunny was openly critical towards the lack of humanitarian aid in the wake of Hurricane Maria, which devastated the island of Puerto Rico. He established the Good Bunny Foundation, which distributes toys to children living in poverty in Puerto Rico.

In 2019, he was nominated for Telemundo's inaugural , in the category of "Humanitarian Award of the Year."

On July 22, 2019, Bad Bunny joined artists such as Residente, Ricky Martin, and more than half a million Puerto Ricans in taking the streets and shutting down the Las Américas Expressway, a major highway also known as the Luis A. Ferré Highway, in protests against government corruption and demanding Ricardo Rosselló's resignation from the office of Governor of Puerto Rico. In May 2020, he had not taken a position regarding the Puerto Rican statehood movement and had stated that he would prefer to answer at a later time with more clarification. He later concluded his answer in January 2021 stating that he would never "want to see Puerto Rico become a State". Although this doesn't necessarily mean however that he advocates for the Independence movement in Puerto Rico either and had only concluded with the statement that he would never like to see Puerto Rico become the 51st state.

In July 2018, Bad Bunny had criticized a nail salon in Asturias, Spain for refusing to give him service since he was a male, the post angered many fans, leading them to leave homophobic comments and even question Bad Bunny's sexuality. Bad Bunny responded to the hateful comments by offering to impregnate the wives of his critics. The post was deleted and Bad Bunny later ended up apologizing and deleting his own Twitter account. 

In January 2019, Bad Bunny criticized a tweet by reggaeton artist Don Omar considered to be homophobic. During a performance on The Tonight Show Starring Jimmy Fallon in February 2020, he called attention to the murder of transgender woman Alexa Negrón Luciano in Puerto Rico by wearing a shirt with the words "They Killed Alexa. Not a Man in a Skirt.", referencing news reports that had misgendered the victim. Ricky Martin has stated that Bad Bunny "has become an icon for the Latin queer community" due to his outspoken support of gay and transgender Latinos as well as his embrace of drag culture.

 Professional wrestling 
During the WWE annual Royal Rumble held on January 31, 2021, he performed his song "Booker T" live, which also had an appearance by the former wrestler of the same name. He  began appearing on WWE's weekly television show, Monday Night Raw.

Wrestler Damian Priest, a fellow Puerto Rican, allied with Bad Bunny and helped him win the WWE 24/7 Championship from Akira Tozawa on the February 15 episode of Raw. On the March 15 episode of Raw, Bad Bunny relinquished the 24/7 Championship to R-Truth in exchange for Stone Cold Steve Austin memorabilia, ending his reign of 28 days.
At WrestleMania 37, Bad Bunny teamed with Damian Priest in a tag team match to defeat The Miz and John Morrison.

On January 29, 2022, at the Royal Rumble, Bad Bunny returned to WWE, competing in the men's Royal Rumble match. He eliminated Sheamus and Dolph Ziggler and lasted until the final 5, when he was eliminated by the eventual winner, Brock Lesnar.

On January 23, 2023, it was announced that Bad Bunny will be the pre-order bonus for WWE 2K23.

 Championships and accomplishments 
 WWE WWE 24/7 Championship (1 time)
 Bumpy Award (1 time)
 Best Moment of the Half-Year (2021) – Bad Bunny competing at WrestleMania

 Achievements 

 Discography Solo studio albums X 100pre (2018)
 YHLQMDLG (2020)
 El Último Tour Del Mundo (2020)
 Un Verano Sin Ti (2022)Collaborative studio albums'''
 Oasis'' (with J Balvin) (2019)

Filmography

Video games

Tours 
 La Nueva Religión Tour (2018)
 X 100Pre Tour (2019)
 El Último Tour del Mundo (2022)
 World's Hottest Tour (2022)

Notes

References

External links 
 

1994 births
Living people
Celebrities who have won professional wrestling championships
Grammy Award winners
Latin Grammy Award winners
People from Vega Baja, Puerto Rico
Puerto Rican hip hop musicians
Puerto Rican rappers
Puerto Rican reggaeton musicians
Singers from San Juan, Puerto Rico
Spanish-language singers
Spanish-language singers of the United States
University of Puerto Rico alumni
WWE 24/7 Champions
Urbano musicians
Latin pop musicians
Latin music songwriters
Sexually fluid men